Gui or GUI may refer to:

People

Surname 
 Gui (surname), an ancient Chinese surname, xing
 Bernard Gui  (1261 or 1262–1331), inquisitor of the Dominican Order
 Luigi Gui (1914–2010), Italian politician
 Gui Minhai (born 1964), Chinese–born Swedish scholar and publisher
 Vittorio Gui (1885–1975), Italian composer

Given name 
 Gui Bonsiepe (born 1934), German designer and academic
 Gui Boratto (born 1974), Brazilian musician
 Gui Brandao (born 1988), Brazilian footballer
 Gui Carvalho (born 2002), Brazilian basketball player
 Gui de Cambrai, French writer
 Gui de Cavalhon, Provençal nobleman
 Gui Guerrejat (died 1178), Occitan noble
 Gui de Maillesec (died 1412), French bishop and cardinal
 Gui Mallon (born 1953), Brazilian composer
 Gui Rochat (born 1933), American art dealer
 Gui d'Ussel, French troubadour

Places
 Guangxi, abbreviated in Chinese as Guì (桂), a province of China
 Guizhou, abbreviated in Chinese as Guì (贵), a province of China
 Gui, Burkina Faso
 Gui Prefecture (disambiguation)
 Gui River, in China
 Guinea, IOC country code GUI

Technology
 Graphical user interface

Other uses 
 Gui (food), Korean grilled dishes
 Gui (vessel), a type of ancient Chinese ritual vessel
 Ghosts in Chinese culture (鬼)
 Golfing Union of Ireland
 Guide Bridge railway station, England
 Güiria Airport, Venezuela

See also
Guy (disambiguation)